Ahqaf al Ruzat  is a village in the District of Jebel el-Akhdar in north-eastern Libya. Ahqaf al Ruzat is located about 23 km northeast of the city of Beida.

References

External links
Satellite map at Maplandia.com

Populated places in Jabal al Akhdar